AutoExpreso is an electronic toll collection system used on tollways in Puerto Rico. The system uses passive transponders where payment status is indicated by a light at the toll plazas. 
In 2012, AutoExpreso became the exclusive form of payment on most of Puerto Rico's tollways, with cash no longer being accepted. However, until 2015, cash was still accepted on PR-5 and PR-22 due to the privatization of those tollways.

In addition to window transponders, a card form of AutoExpreso known as MóvilCash is also available.  AutoExpreso is not interoperable with other electronic toll collection systems outside Puerto Rico (such as E-ZPass in the northeastern United States or SunPass in Florida).

Accepting tollways
Puerto Rico Highway 5
Teodoro Moscoso Bridge on Puerto Rico Highway 17
Puerto Rico Highway 20
Puerto Rico Highway 22
Puerto Rico Highway 52
Puerto Rico Highway 53
Puerto Rico Highway 66

References

Electronic toll collection
Transportation in Puerto Rico